The 1956 NCAA University Division football season saw the University of Oklahoma Sooners finish a third consecutive season unbeaten and untied to again win the national championship.

The 1956 season saw the NCAA split member schools into two divisions: larger schools were part of the University Division, later known as NCAA Division I, and smaller schools were placed in the College Division, later split into NCAA Division II and NCAA Division III.

During the 20th century, the NCAA had no playoff for the major college football teams in the University Division, later known as Division I-A and now known as Division I FBS. The NCAA did recognize a national champion based upon the final results of "wire service" (AP and UPI) polls.  The extent of that recognition came in the form of acknowledgment in the annual NCAA Football Guide of the "unofficial" national champions.  The AP poll in 1956 consisted of the votes of as many as 198 sportswriters.  Though not all writers voted in every poll, each would give their opinion of the twenty best teams.  Under a point system of 20 points for first place, 19 for second, etc., the "overall" ranking was determined.  Although the rankings were based on the collective opinion of the representative sportswriters, the teams that remained "unbeaten and untied" were generally ranked higher than those that had not.  A defeat, even against a strong opponent, tended to cause a team to drop in the rankings, and a team with two or more defeats was unlikely to remain in the Top 20.

Generally, the top teams played on New Year's Day in the four major postseason bowl games: the Rose Bowl (near Los Angeles at Pasadena), the Sugar Bowl (New Orleans), the Orange Bowl (Miami), and the Cotton Bowl (Dallas).  Because the rules of the time for Oklahoma's conference (at that time, Big 7) did not permit consecutive bowl appearances, No. 1 Oklahoma did not play in the postseason, with runner-up Colorado going to the Orange Bowl instead.

Conference and program changes

Conference changes
One new conference began play in 1956:
 Ivy League – active NCAA Division I FCS conference

Membership changes

September
In the preseason poll released on September 17, the defending champion Oklahoma Sooners, coming into the season with a 30-game winning streak, were the first place choice for 116 of 149 writers casting votes. They were followed by Michigan State, Notre Dame, Georgia Tech and Ohio State.  New polls were issued weekly on Monday.

On September 22, No. 1 Oklahoma and No. 2 Michigan State were idle.  No. 3 Notre Dame lost in Dallas to unranked SMU, 19–13 and dropped out of the top 5 for the season (and finished 2–8), while SMU would rise to fifth. No. 4 Georgia Tech won at Kentucky, 14–6.  No. 5 Ohio State, which had not started play, fell out of the Top 5 and was replaced by No. 7 TCU, which had opened with a 32–0 win at Kansas.  The first regular AP poll was No. 1 Oklahoma, No. 2 Georgia Tech, No. 3 Michigan State, No. 4 TCU, and No. 5 SMU.

September 29, No. 1 Oklahoma opened its season with a 36–0 win over North Carolina.  In Dallas, No. 2 Georgia Tech visited No. 5 SMU and narrowly won 9–7. No. 3 Michigan State won 21–7 at No. 12 Stanford. No. 4 TCU was idle and dropped to 8th, while No. 8 Ohio State rose to 4th after a 34–7 win hosting Nebraska.  No. 13 Michigan, which had beaten UCLA 42–13, rose to 5th.  The next poll was No. 1 Oklahoma, No. 2 Michigan State, No. 3 Georgia Tech, No. 4 Ohio State, and No. 5 Michigan.

October
October 6 No. 1 Oklahoma registered another shutout, beating Kansas State 66–0.  No. 2 Michigan State met No. 5 Michigan in the rain before a crowd of 101,001 at Ann Arbor, and MSU Coach Duffy Daugherty's "umbrella defense" forced two Michigan turnovers that led to the Spartans' 9–0 win   No. 3 Georgia Tech was idle, and No. 4 Ohio State won 32–20 at home before 82,881 over Stanford.  The poll saw Michigan drop to 12th, while No. 8 TCU (which beat Arkansas 41–6 on national television) returned to the top five: No. 1 Oklahoma, No. 2 Michigan State, No. 3 Georgia Tech, No. 4 TCU, and No. 5 Ohio State.

October 13 At Dallas, No. 1 Oklahoma beat Texas 45–0, having outscored its opposition 147–0 in three games.  A commentator of the day wrote, "The overpowering charge of the big red-shirted Oklahoma line ahead of adroit Quarterback Jimmy Harris is just one of the reasons why Oklahoma may be the greatest college football team of all time... They showed it in the sudden, lifting charge of a line which moved all of a piece, like a wave breaking evenly along a beach." No. 2 Michigan State defeated Indiana 53–6 at home.  No. 3 Georgia Tech beat LSU, 39–7.  No. 4 TCU won at Alabama 23–6, and No. 5 Ohio State won 26–6 at Illinois.   The top five remained unchanged.

October 20 No. 1 Oklahoma gave up its first points of the season, but registered its fourth win, 34–12, at Kansas. No. 2 Michigan State stayed unbeaten with a 47–14 win at Notre Dame.  No. 3 Georgia Tech beat Auburn 28–7.  In a game that would ultimately determine the SWC championship, No. 4 TCU lost at No. 14 Texas A&M, 7–6.  No. 5 Ohio State lost to Penn State by the same 7–6 score.  No. 7 Tennessee, which had beaten Alabama 24–0, rose to 4th, and No. 8 Michigan returned to the Top 5 after its 34–20 win over Northwestern.  The next poll: No. 1 Michigan State, No. 2 Oklahoma, No. 3 Georgia Tech, No. 4 Tennessee, and No. 5 Michigan.

October 27 The new No. 1 Michigan State went to Champaign, and had a 13–0 lead over unranked Illinois at halftime.  Abe Woodson plunged for a score to cut the lead to 13–6 after three quarters.  In the fourth, Woodson ran 70 yards from scrimmage to help tie the game 13–13.  After an MSU field goal was short, Woodson ran the ball up to the Illini 18.  Woodson, who had once held the world record in the 50 yard high hurdles, took a short pass and dashed 82 yards for a touchdown, leaping over State's Art Johnson 30 yards from goal, to pull off the 20–13 upset. No. 2 Oklahoma was determined to prove itself number 1, and Coach Bud Wilkinson directed the team to six touchdowns for a 40–0 win at Notre Dame.  No. 3 Georgia Tech beat No. 15 Tulane by the same 40–0 margin. No. 4 Tennessee beat Maryland 34–7 to stay unbeaten.  No. 5 Michigan had its second loss, falling to unranked Minnesota at home, 20–7.  No. 7 Texas A&M, which had extended its record to 5–0–1 with a 19–13 win at No. 8 Baylor, replaced the Wolverines.  The next poll: No. 1 Oklahoma, No. 2 Georgia Tech, No. 3 Tennessee, No. 4 Michigan State, and No. 5 Texas A&M.

November
November 3 Unbeaten No. 1 Oklahoma (5–0), met the Colorado Buffaloes (5–1) on the road, and were losing 19–6 at halftime to a team that was a four-touchdown underdog, but came back with touchdowns by Tommy McDonald and Clendon Thomas for a difficult 27–19 win. The rest of top five won in shutouts: No. 2 Georgia Tech won 7–0 at Duke, No. 3 Tennessee over North Carolina 20–0, No. 4 Michigan State crushed Wisconsin 33–0, and No. 5 Texas A&M beat Arkansas 27–0.  The poll remained unchanged.

November 10 
While No. 1 Oklahoma registered its fifth shutout in seven games, trouncing Iowa State 44–0, No. 2 Georgia Tech and No. 3 Tennessee met in Atlanta for a game that proved to determine the SEC title.  There were 23 punts altogether, and no score until midway through the third quarter, when Tennessee end Buddy Cruze noticed that Tech had stopped double-teaming him.  Halfback Johnny Majors (who would later be head coach for UT) passed to Cruze at the 35–yard line, and Cruze ran 64 yards down to the Tech goal line, setting up the touchdown that won the game 6–0.    In the poll that followed, Tennessee was the new No. 1 by a margin of 2 points (1,446 to 1,444) over Oklahoma.  No. 4 Michigan State narrowly beat Purdue, 12–9. No. 5 Texas A&M beat SMU 33–7 in Dallas, and increased its record to 7–0–1. Though on probation since 1955 for recruiting violations, coach Bear Bryant's Aggies had appealed to the NCAA to allow them to play in the postseason (as the top contenders for the Southwest Conference title, they would receive an automatic bid in the Cotton Bowl).  The next day, however, the NCAA announced that Texas A&M was still banned, because of an additional recruiting violation of a basketball player.  The next poll: No. 1 Tennessee, No. 2 Oklahoma, No. 3 Michigan State, No. 4 Georgia Tech, and No. 5 Texas A&M.

November 17 No. 1 Tennessee beat visiting No. 19 Ole Miss 27–7, while No. 2 Oklahoma showed off its offense in crushing Missouri 67–14, sufficiently enough to regain the top spot in the next poll. No. 3 Michigan State traveled to Minnesota, which had been No. 6 a week before, but dropped to No. 17 after a loss to Iowa.  The MSU visitors lost, 14–13, and dropped to tenth place in the next poll. No. 4 Georgia Tech beat Alabama 27–0. No. 5 Texas A&M beat visiting Rice, 21–7.  No. 7 Iowa, which clinched an unexpected Big Ten championship by defeating No. 6 Ohio State 6–0, took Michigan State's place in the poll that followed.  The Top 5 was No. 1 Oklahoma, No. 2 Tennessee, No. 3 Iowa, No. 4 Texas A&M, and No. 5 Georgia Tech.

November 24 No. 1 Oklahoma gained 656 net yards in a defeat of visiting Nebraska 54–6. No. 2 Tennessee beat Kentucky 20–7. No. 3 Iowa finished its season with a 48–8 non-league win over Notre Dame, then accepted a bid to the Rose Bowl to play the PCC champion, No. 11 Oregon State.  No. 4 Texas A&M was idle as it prepared for its Thanksgiving Day game with Texas, which it won 34–21.  In Jacksonville, No. 5 Georgia Tech beat No. 13 Florida 28–0, and traded places with A&M.  Tech would be invited back to the city for the Gator Bowl at season's end.  The next poll: No. 1 Oklahoma, No. 2 Tennessee, No. 3 Iowa, No. 4 Georgia Tech, and No. 5 Texas A&M.

December 1 No. 1 Oklahoma closed its season with a 53–0 win over Oklahoma A&M, finishing 10–0, and with a 466–51 finish in points.  Only one of its ten opponents (Colorado) finished 1956 with a winning record. In Nashville, No. 2 Tennessee beat Vanderbilt 27–7 to close with a 10–0 record and a spot in the Sugar Bowl, where it would face 8–2 Baylor.  No. 4 Georgia Tech closed with a 35–0 win at Georgia.  Unbeaten and once-tied (9–0–1), No. 5 Texas A&M won the Southwest Conference title, but the ban against post-season play sent runner-up TCU to the Cotton Bowl instead. The top five teams in the final poll remained the same from the previous week.

Conference standings

Bowl games

Major bowls
Tuesday, January 1, 1957

Other bowls

Minor bowls

Rankings

Final polls
Final polls were released at the end of the regular season. Records include bowl games.

Heisman Trophy voting
The Heisman Trophy is given to the year's most outstanding player

Source:

See also
1956 College Football All-America Team

References